is a Japanese former professional basketball player who last played for the Akita Northern Happinets of the B.League in Japan. He played college basketball for Takushoku University.

Non-FIBA Events Stats

|-
| style="text-align:left;"| 2015
| style="text-align:left;"| Universiade
| 8 ||  ||5.29  || .429 ||.333  || .000|| 1.1 ||0.4 || 0.4 || 0.0|| 1.9
|-
|}

Career statistics

Regular season 

|-
| align="left" | 2016-17
| align="left" | FE Nagoya
|26 ||2 || 18.9 ||31.5  || 30.0 ||65.5  || 2.0 || 1.8 || 0.5 ||0.2  ||5.2 
|-
| align="left" | 2017-18
| align="left" | FE Nagoya
|48 ||33 || 22.9 ||33.2  || 27.9 ||67.5  || 1.8 ||3.8  || 0.9 ||0.0  || 6.1
|-
| align="left" | 2018-19
| align="left" | Akita
| 53 || 20 ||14.4  ||  25.8 || 22.8 || 75.0  ||1.4 || 1.5 || 0.5 ||0.0||3.0
|-
|- class="sortbottom"
! style="text-align:center;" colspan=2|  Career 

!127 ||55 || 18.5 ||.306  || .268 ||.694  || 1.7 ||2.4  || 0.7 ||0.0  || 4.6
|-

Early cup games 

|-
|style="text-align:left;"|2018
|style="text-align:left;"|Akita
| 2 ||0 || 28.12 || .143 || .333 || .500 || 2.0 || 1.0 || 0.5 || 0 || 2.5
|-

Preseason games

|-
| align="left" |2018
| align="left" | Akita
| 2 || 1 || 17.8 || .429 ||.500  || .333||2.0 || 2.5|| 1.0|| 0.0 ||  4.5
|-

Source: Changwon1Changwon2

References

External links
Stats
Highlights 2018

1994 births
Living people
Akita Northern Happinets players
Japanese men's basketball players
Sportspeople from Aichi Prefecture
Point guards